Events in the year 2021 in Albania.

Incumbents
President: Ilir Meta
Prime Minister: Edi Rama
Deputy Prime Minister: Erion Braçe (until 18 September); Arben Ahmetaj (from 18 September)

Events
Ongoing — COVID-19 pandemic in Albania

April 
19 April – A mass stabbing at a mosque in Tirana leaves five worshipers injured.

25 April – The 2021 Albanian parliamentary election.

June 

 11 June – During the 2021 United Nations Security Council Elections, Albania was elected to serve a two-year term, beginning in 2022, as a non-permanent member of the UN Security Council. It will be the first time Albania has sat on the Security Council.

Deaths
1 January – Dhimitër Orgocka, actor and director, People's Artist of Albania (b. 1936).
1 March – Agim Krajka, composer (born 1937).

References

 
2020s in Albania
Years of the 21st century in Albania
Albania
Albania